Euchroea coelestis is a species of beetles of the family Scarabaeidae and subfamily Cetoniinae.

Subspecies
Euchroea coelestis coelestis Burmeister, 1842 
Euchroea coelestis peyrierasi Ruter, 1973

Description
The basic color of this flower beetle is black, with blue streaked elytra.

Distribution
This species can be found in Madagascar.

Gallery

References
  Biolib
 Global Species 

Cetoniinae
Beetles described in 1842